Leonel López Cortez, (born February 10, 1970) most commonly known as Leonel López, is the founder and president of the United Premier Soccer League and team owner of Santa Ana Winds FC. He holds a United States Soccer Federation National D Coaches License.

Playing career

Leonel Lopez played Open Division, amateur soccer in the Orange County, California area with Sunday league, Latino clubs from 1987 to 2000 before coaching various Orange County teams from 2002-09.

 Real Zitácuaro, 1987–90
 Zamora FC, 1991
 Orange County Impact FC, 1992–94
 Anaheim Cruz Azul, 1995–99
 Municipal FC, 1998-00

Enterprises

 United Premier Soccer League, Est. 2011
 TVE MAX (video production), Est. 2015
 Mabury Cleaners - Santa Ana, CA, Est. 2007-10
 My Maria's Steak House - Bellflower, CA, Est. 2007-12

Affiliations
 United Premier Soccer League
 United States Adult Soccer Association
 US Club Soccer
 Orange County Hispanic Chamber of Commerce (formerly)
 California Dry Cleaners Association (formerly)

References

External links 
 United Premier Soccer League
 Santa Ana Winds FC
 TVE MAX
 Meet the Underdogs: Santa Ana Winds FC

Living people
1970 births
Santa Ana Winds FC
United Premier Soccer League
Soccer players from California
American soccer chairmen and investors
American soccer coaches
Sportspeople from Orange County, California
Association footballers not categorized by position
Association football players not categorized by nationality